Ursula Gather (born 28 April 1953) is a German statistician and academic administrator. From 2008 to 2020, she was rector of TU Dortmund University. Since 2013, Gather has been chairwoman of the Alfried Krupp von Bohlen und Halbach Foundation.

Early life and education
Gather is originally from Mönchengladbach. She studied mathematics at RWTH Aachen University, earning a doctorate there in 1979 and her habilitation in 1984.

Career
After working at RWTH Aachen University as an assistant beginning in 1976, Gather became a professor at the University of Iowa in 1985, but returned to Germany in 1986 as a professor in the faculty of statistics at the Technical University of Dortmund, where she was chair for mathematical statistics and industrial applications. She was dean of the faculty from 1991 to 1994, and became rector at TU Dortmund in 2008.

Since 2013 Gather has been chairing the board of trustees of the Alfried Krupp von Bohlen und Halbach Foundation, succeeding Berthold Beitz. The foundation owns a major stake in the ThyssenKrupp conglomerate. Since 2016, she has been a member of the senate of the German National Academy of Sciences Leopoldina.

Other activities

Corporate boards
 Munich Re, Member of the Supervisory Board (since 2014)

Non-profit organizations
 TÜV Rheinland Stiftung, Member of the Board of Trustees (since 2022)
 Kiel University, Chair of the Board of Trustees (since 2021)
 Alfried Krupp Institute for Advanced Study, Member of the Board of Trustees
 E.ON Stiftung, Member of the Advisory Board
 Max Planck Institute of Molecular Physiology, Member of the Board of Trustees

Recognition
The festschrift Robustness and Complex Data Structures: Festschrift in Honour of Ursula Gather was published in honor of Gather's 60th birthday in 2013. In 2015, she received an honorary doctorate from the Łódź University of Technology. Furthermore, Gather was awarded the Order of Merit of the Federal Republic of Germany in 2018.

References

1953 births
Living people
People from Mönchengladbach
German statisticians
Women statisticians
RWTH Aachen University alumni
University of Iowa faculty
Academic staff of the Technical University of Dortmund